2009 Icelandic Men's Football League Cup was the 14th season of the Icelandic Men's League Cup, a pre-season professional football competition in Iceland. The competition started on 20 February 2009 and concluded on 1 May 2009. FH beat Breiðablik 3–0 in the final and won their fifth League Cup title.

The 24 teams were divided into 4 groups of 6 teams. Every team played every other team of its group once, either home or away. Top 2 teams from each group qualified for the quarter-finals.

Group stage
The games were played from 20 February to 18 April 2009.

Group 1

Group 2

Group 3

Group 4

Knockout stage
Source: ksi.is

Quarterfinals
The games were played on 22, 23 and 24 April 2009.

Semifinals
The games were played on 27 April 2009.

Final

External links
 Deildabikar on rsssf.com

2009 domestic association football cups
2009 in Icelandic football
Icelandic Men's Football League Cup